Mayfield Senior School is an independent Catholic college preparatory school, founded in 1931 for young women grades 9-12. It is sponsored by the Society of the Holy Child Jesus, a member of the Holy Child Network of Schools and is guided by the educational philosophy of the Society's foundress, Cornelia Connelly.

Description
Mayfield is affiliated with the Roman Catholic Archdiocese of Los Angeles.  The total enrollment is about 330, with a 1:7 faculty/student ratio, an average class size of 15, has a 100% college acceptance rate and is 52% ethnically diverse. The school located at 500 Bellefontaine Street in Pasadena, California. It offers nine Conservatory of the Arts programs and 23 competitive teams in 12 sports.

History
Mayfield School was founded in 1931 by the Society of the Holy Child Jesus at the invitation of John Joseph Cantwell, then the Bishop of Los Angeles-San Diego (as the Archdiocese of Los Angeles was then known as). In 1950, the school split into  Senior and Junior Schools due to space constraints and zoning regulations. The Junior School (K - 8) remains on the original Euclid Avenue campus while the Senior School (high school) moved to its current location on Bellefontaine Street. The Senior School remains girls-only while the Junior School became coeducational after the split.

Academics
It offers 28 AP classes. Students take classes in eight different subject areas: English, Fine Arts, World Languages, Mathematics, Physical Education, Theology, Science, and Social Studies.

Mayfield is accredited by the Western Association of Schools and Colleges. The school is also a member of:

 The Holy Child Network of Schools
 The National Association of Independent Schools
 The California Association of Independent Schools
 The National Coalition of Girls' Schools
 The National Catholic Education Association
 The College Entrance Examination Board
 The National Association for College Counseling
 The Western Association for College Admission Counseling
 The Educational Records Bureau
 The Pasadena Area Independent Schools Association
 Council for the Advancement and Support of Education

Mayfield has two full-time college counselors that help every student through the college application process. College counseling is an extension of Mayfield education and each student has access to both counselors. Both counselors stay current and up to date with their knowledge by touring colleges each year. This helps give the girls the best opportunity to fit the school with the best "fit".

Strub Hall
Originally known as the Marshallia mansion, Strub Hall, on Grand Avenue, was built in 1919. It became Mayfield's Bellefontaine campus home in 1950, having been gifted by Dr. Charles H. Strub and his wife, Vera.

Appearances in popular culture

Mayfield has also served as a filming location for many TV shows and movies, such as Marvel’s Runaways, The Lost World: Jurassic Park , The Nutty Professor, All About Steve, and Legally Blonde.

References

External links

 School Website
 School Newspaper Website

Girls' schools in California
Roman Catholic secondary schools in Los Angeles County, California
Educational institutions established in 1931
Society of the Holy Child Jesus
Education in Pasadena, California
Private high schools in California
Catholic secondary schools in California
1931 establishments in California